Hämeenlinna sub-region  is a subdivision of Tavastia Proper and one of the Sub-regions of Finland since 2009.

Municipalities 

Sub-regions of Finland
Geography of Kanta-Häme